, nicknamed Shocho,  is a former Japanese professional basketball player and  served for Akita Northern Happinets of the B.League as the ambassador. Takahashi is currently the instructor for Toreiku Katagami. He was selected by the Sendai 89ers with the third overall pick in the 2006 bj League draft.  He has played for the four Tohoku clubs of the bj league. In October 2015 he became a one-day honorary police chief at the Akita Higashi Police Station. Since then a police officer salute has become popular among Akita's boosters. Takahashi studies NBA to improve his game, and he is an Air Jordan collector. His retirement memorial game was held at Akita Prefectural Gymnasium on October 29, 2017.

Career statistics

Regular season 

|-
| align="left" | 2006-07
| align="left" | Sendai
| 40 || 40 || 29.2 || 37.0 || 34.6 || 62.5 || 0.9 || 1.8 || 0.6 || 0.0 ||  8.5
|-
| align="left" | 2007-08
| align="left" | Sendai
| 41 || 37 || 24.1 || 40.3 || 32.5 || 73.8 || 0.9 || 2.2 || 0.7 || 0.0 || 6.7
|-
| align="left" | 2008-09
| align="left" | Sendai
| 52 || 52 || 28.4 || 39.4 || 37.3 || 76.8 || 1.4 || 3.8 || 0.8 || 0.1 ||  8.8 
|-
| align="left" | 2009-10
| align="left" | Sendai
| 47 || 45 || 29.0 || 39.9 || 34.7 ||style="background-color:#CFECEC;| 88.2 || 1.2 || 3.6 || 0.4 || 0.2 ||  10.9
|-
| align="left" | 2010-11
| align="left" | Sendai
| 32 || 3 || 23.0 || 40.3 || 37.6 || 83.7 || 1.0 || 2.4 || 0.3 || 0.0 || 7.2 
|-
| align="left" | 2011-12
| align="left" | Sendai
| 42 || 3 || 11.1 || 38.8 || 28.8 || 70.0 || 0.5 || 0.7 || 0.3 || 0.0 || 3.4
|-
| align="left" | 2012-13
| align="left" | Iwate
| 52 || 49 || 30.5 || 43.6 || 42.5 || 79.2 || 1.8 || 2.7 || 0.7 || 0.1 || 10.3
|-
| align="left" | 2013-14
| align="left" | Iwate
| 52 || 50 || 28.9 || 42.8 || 37.6 || 84.5 || 1.7 || 3.4 || 0.8 || 0.1 ||  10.1
|-
| align="left" | 2014-15
| align="left" | Aomori
| 48 || 24 || 21.6 || 34.4 || 31.0 || 87.5 || 1.5 || 2.7 || 0.4 || 0.1 ||  6.3
|-
| align="left" | 2015-16
| align="left" | Akita
| 52 || 0 || 20.0 || 37.4 || 34.3 || 77.8 || 1.6 || 2.9 || 0.3 || 0.0 ||  4.9
|-
|style="background-color:#FFCCCC"  align="left" | 2016-17
| align="left" | Akita
| 55 || 2 || 12.7 || 36.0 || 36.4 || 66.7 || 0.7 || 0.7 || 0.2 || 0.0 || 2.8
|-
|-
|- class="sortbottom"
! style="text-align:center;" colspan=2| Career 2006-17

!513 ||305 || 23.5 ||.395  || .356 ||.805  || 1.2 ||2.5  || 0.5 ||0.1  || 7.3
|-

Playoffs 

|-
|style="text-align:left;"|2011-12
|style="text-align:left;"|Sendai
| 2 ||  || 7.0 || .143 || .000 || .000 || 0.0 || 0.0 || 0.0 || 0.0 ||1.0
|-
|style="text-align:left;"|2015-16
|style="text-align:left;"|Akita
| 6 || 0 || 20.17 || .361 || .375 || .833 || 1.17 || 2.83 || 0.33 || 0.17 ||6.17
|-
|-
|style="text-align:left;"|2016-17
|style="text-align:left;"|Akita
| 3 || 0 ||  || .333 || .000 || .000 || 0.33 || 0.66 || 0.33 || 0 ||0.7
|-

Trivia
 
He loves to read Yoshihiro Takahashi's Ginga: Nagareboshi Gin manga.

Personal

His father Norito Takahashi runs a restaurant in Okubo, Katagami where Kenichi's awards, pictures and uniforms are displayed.

References

External links
 
3 point and Fly Again
Bj League 3 point contest

1980 births
Living people
Akita Northern Happinets players
Aomori Wat's players
Iwate Big Bulls players
Japanese men's basketball players
Prestige International Aranmare Akita coaches
Sendai 89ers players
Sportspeople from Akita Prefecture
Tohoku Gakuin University alumni